Nepal Reinsurance Company '(Nepal Re)' is Nepal's first reinsurance company  which was successor  of the insurance pool that was set up in 2003 with the aim to cover the losses arising from situations like riot,sabotage or terrorism and malacious damage (RSTMD) during the Insurgency.

Structure
The current paid-up capital of Nepal Reinsurance is 11.65 Billion. The following table shows the percentage of shareholdings by the respective shareholders on the capital structure:

References

External links
 Company Profile of NRIC by ICRA
 News coverage by Insurancekhabar
 Appointment of Chairman
 Official Web portal of NRIC

Insurance
Insurance companies based in Nepal